The 1978 Giro di Lombardia was the 72nd edition of the Giro di Lombardia cycle race and was held on 7 October 1978. The race started in Milan and finished in Como. The race was won by Francesco Moser of the Sanson team.

General classification

References

1978
Giro di Lombardia
Giro di Lombardia
1978 Super Prestige Pernod